Coquille Junior Senior High, formerly known as Coquille High School, is a public high school in Coquille, Oregon, United States.

Students
According to the Oregon Department of Education School Report Card for the 2017–2018 school year, Coquille Junior Senior High enrolled 324 students in grades 7-12.

Academics
93% of high school students attending Coquille Junior Senior High graduated with a high school diploma on time for the 2017–2018 school year.

Mascot
Historically the Red Devil Baby in numerous forms has been the mascot of Coquille High School.

Sports
The Coquille Football team won the 2A state championship in 2021 versus the Kennedy Trojans in a 38 to 28 victory. It's the school's first football state championship win since 1970. Gunner Yates was a menace in this game, running for 388 yards and 5 touchdowns.

References

High schools in Coos County, Oregon
Public high schools in Oregon